This is a list of intelligence gathering disciplines.

HUMINT 

Human intelligence (HUMINT) are gathered from a person in the location in question. Sources can include the following:

 Advisors or foreign internal defense (FID) personnel working with host nation (HN) forces or populations
 Diplomatic reporting by accredited diplomats (e.g. military attachés)
 Espionage clandestine reporting, access agents, couriers, cutouts
 Military attachés
 Non-governmental organizations (NGOs)
 Prisoners of war (POWs) or detainees
 Refugees
 Routine patrolling (military police, patrols, etc.)
 Special reconnaissance
 Traveler debriefing (e.g. CIA Domestic Contact Service)

MI6 is often thought to use human intelligence to operate in different countries or Britain itself to protect the country from global affairs. However, this is usually confused with their brother agency MI5, which focuses on the security of Britain.

GEOINT 

Geospatial intelligence (GEOINT) are gathered from satellite and aerial photography, or mapping/terrain data.

 Imagery intelligence (IMINT) – gathered from satellite and aerial photography

MASINT 

Measurement and signature intelligence (MASINT) are gathered from an array of signatures (distinctive characteristics) of fixed or dynamic target sources. According to the Air Force Institute of Technology's Center for MASINT Studies and Research, MASINT is split into six major disciplines: electro-optical, nuclear, radar, geophysical, materials, and radiofrequency.

 Electro-optical MASINT
 Airborne electro-optical missile tracking MASINT
 Tactical counter-artillery sensors
 Infrared MASINT
 Optical measurement of nuclear explosions
 LASER MASINT
 Spectroscopic MASINT
 Hyperspectral MASINT
 Space-based staring infrared sensors
 Nuclear MASINT
 Radiation survey and dosimetry
 Space-based nuclear energy detection
 Effects of ionizing radiation on materials
 Geophysical MASINT
 Weather and sea intelligence MASINT
 Acoustic MASINT, also known as acoustical intelligence (ACOUSTINT or ACINT)
 Seismic MASINT
 Magnetic MASINT
 Gravitimetric MASINT
 Radar MASINT
 Line-of-sight radar MASINT
 Synthetic aperture radar (SAR) and inverse synthetic aperture radar (ISAR) MASINT
 Non-cooperative target recognition
 Multistatic radar MASINT
 Passive covert radar
 Materials MASINT
 Chemical materials MASINT
 Biological materials MASINT
 Nuclear test analysis
 Radiofrequency MASINT
 Frequency domain MASINT
 Electromagnetic pulse MASINT
 Unintentional radiation MASINT

OSINT 

Open-source intelligence (OSINT) are gathered from open sources. OSINT can be further segmented by the source type: Internet/General, Scientific/Technical, and various HUMINT specialties, e.g. trade shows, association meetings, and interviews.

SIGINT 

Signals intelligence (SIGINT) are gathered from interception of signals.

 Communications intelligence (COMINT)
 Electronic intelligence (ELINT) – gathered from electronic signals that do not contain speech or text (which are considered COMINT)
 Foreign instrumentation signals intelligence (FISINT) – entails the collection and analysis of telemetry data from a missile or sometimes from aircraft tests; formerly known as telemetry intelligence or TELINT

TECHINT 

Technical intelligence (TECHINT) are gathered from analysis of weapons and equipment used by the armed forces of foreign nations, or environmental conditions.

 Medical intelligence (MEDINT) – gathered from analysis of medical records and/or actual physiological examinations to determine health and/or particular ailments and allergic conditions for consideration

CYBINT/DNINT 
Cyber or digital network intelligence (CYBINT or DNINT) are gathered from cyberspace. CYBINT can be considered as a subset of OSINT.

FININT 

Financial intelligence (FININT) are gathered from analysis of monetary transactions.

See also 

 Cryptanalysis
 Meteorological intelligence
 Operations security
 Spy satellite
 TEMPEST
 Traffic analysis

References 

 
Open-source intelligence
Government-related lists